The 1997 World Orienteering Championships, the 17th World Orienteering Championships, were held in Grimstad, Norway, 11–16 August 1997.

The championships had six events; the classic distance (formerly called individual) for men and women, the short distance for men and women, and relays for men and women.

Medalists

References 

World Orienteering Championships
1997 in Norwegian sport
International sports competitions hosted by Norway
August 1997 sports events in Europe
Orienteering in Norway
Grimstad